Jim Cook Lake is a lake in Wadena County, in the U.S. state of Minnesota.

Jim Cook Lake bears the name of Jim Cook, a pioneer settler.

See also
List of lakes in Minnesota

References

Lakes of Minnesota
Lakes of Wadena County, Minnesota